Ctenoglypta newtoni was a species of small air-breathing land snails, terrestrial pulmonate gastropod mollusks in the family Euconulidae, the hive snails. This species was endemic to Mauritius.  It is now extinct.

References

Ctenoglypta
Extinct gastropods
Extinct animals of Africa
Gastropods described in 1871
Taxonomy articles created by Polbot